André Bestbier  (31 March 1946 – 8 August 2021) was a South African rugby union player and army officer, who was the commander of the Orange Free State Command from 1992 to 1995.

Rugby career
Bestbier played his provincial rugby for the Free State and made his test debut for the Springboks during the Springbok tour of France, as a replacement for Robert Cockrell after 28 minutes in the second half of the second test on 30 November 1974 at Parc des Princes in Paris. This second half appearance was his only test for South Africa, but he played in a further four tour matches for the Springboks during the French tour.

Test history

See also
List of South Africa national rugby union players – Springbok no.  485

References

1946 births
2021 deaths
Afrikaner people
Free State Cheetahs players
Rugby union players from Potchefstroom
South Africa international rugby union players
South African rugby union players
Rugby union hookers